Serious Reflections During the Life and Surprising Adventures of Robinson Crusoe: With his Vision of the Angelick World (1720) is the third book featuring the character of Robinson Crusoe and the sequel to The Farther Adventures of Robinson Crusoe (1719). Unlike the previous two volumes, it is not a work of narrative fiction. Rather, it consists of a series of essays written in the voice of the character Robinson Crusoe. These essays touch on topics including solitude, religion, liberty, and epistemology of mind, showing the influence of Locke and Montaigne.

References

External links
Serious reflections during the life and surprising adventures of Robinson Crusoe: with his Vision of the angelick world

1720 novels
Novels by Daniel Defoe
English adventure novels
English historical novels
Novels about pirates
Sequel novels
Robinson Crusoe
Novels about cannibalism
18th-century British novels